Stoner is an unincorporated community in Montezuma County, in the U.S. state of Colorado.

History
A post office called Stoner was established in 1917, and remained in operation until 1954. The community takes its name from nearby Stoner Creek.

References

Unincorporated communities in Montezuma County, Colorado
Unincorporated communities in Colorado